Kenneth Mackenzie, Kenneth MacKenzie, or Kenneth McKenzie may refer to:

Clergypeople and missionaries 
 John Kenneth MacKenzie (1850–1888), known as J. Kenneth MacKenzie, British medical missionary in China
 Kenneth Mackenzie (bishop of Argyll and The Isles) (1863–1945), Episcopal bishop in Scotland
 Kenneth Mackenzie (bishop of Brechin) (1876–1966), Episcopal bishop in Scotland
 Kenneth Mackenzie (missionary) (1920–1971), minister of the Church of Scotland and missionary in Central Africa

Politicians and judges 
 Kenneth McKenzie (Manitoba politician) (1822–1911), rancher and politician in Manitoba, Canada
 Sir Kenneth Mackenzie, 3rd Baronet ( – 1728), British Member of Parliament for Cromartyshire and Nairnshire
 Kenneth James Muir MacKenzie (1882–1931), British soldier, lawyer, and judge
 Kenneth Mackenzie, Lord Fortrose (1717–1761), British Member of Parliament for Ross-shire and Inverness Burghs
 Kenneth Muir Mackenzie, 1st Baron Muir Mackenzie (1845–1930), British barrister, civil servant and Labour politician
 Kenneth W. MacKenzie (1862–1929), mayor of Edmonton, Alberta, Canada
 Kenneth Mackenzie, 1st Earl of Seaforth (1744–1781) (of the second creation), British Member of Parliament for Buteshire and Caithness

Peers and Scottish clan chiefs 
 Kenneth Mackenzie, 1st Earl of Seaforth (1744–1781) (of the second creation), British Member of Parliament for Buteshire and Caithness
 Kenneth Mackenzie, 3rd Earl of Seaforth (1635–1678), Highland clan chief and Scottish nobleman
 Kenneth Mackenzie, 4th Earl of Seaforth (1661–1701), Scottish peer and Jacobite supporter
 Kenneth Mackenzie, 1st Lord Mackenzie of Kintail ( – 1611), first Lord Mackenzie of Kintail
 Kenneth Mackenzie, 7th of Kintail (died 1492), chief of the Clan Mackenzie
 Kenneth Mackenzie, 8th of Kintail (died ), Highland chief
 Kenneth Mackenzie, 10th of Kintail (died 1568), chief of the Clan Mackenzie
 Kenneth Mackenzie, Lord Fortrose (1717–1761), British Member of Parliament for Ross-shire and Inverness Burghs
 Kenneth Muir Mackenzie, 1st Baron Muir Mackenzie (1845–1930), British barrister, civil servant and Labour politician

Others 
 Kenneth Mackenzie (author) (1913–1955), Australian poet and novelist
 Kenneth MacKenzie (baseball) or Ken MacKenzie (born 1934), Canadian Major League Baseball pitcher
 Kenneth MacKenzie (British general) or Kenneth Douglas (1754–1833), British army general and architect of the Shorncliffe Method for Light Infantry training
 Kenneth MacKenzie (businessman) or Ken MacKenzie (born 1964), Canadian-born businessman and Chairman of BHP
 Kenneth McKenzie (footballer, born 1887) or Ken McKenzie (1887–1958), Australian rules footballer
 Kenneth McKenzie (fur trader) (died 1861), fur trader in the upper Missouri River valley
 Kenneth McKenzie (rugby league) or Ken McKenzie (1926–1998), Australian rugby league footballer
 Sir Kenneth Mackenzie, 6th Baronet (1832–1900), British diplomat and landowner
 Kenneth D. Mackenzie (born 1937), American organizational theorist and management consultant
 Kenneth F. McKenzie Jr. (born 1957), US Marine Corps general
 Kenneth Kent Mackenzie (1877–1934), lawyer and amateur botanist
 Kenneth N. MacKenzie (1897–1951), officer in the merchant fleet known for his role in Antarctic research expeditions
 Kenneth R. Mackenzie (1908–1990), British scholar and parliamentary clerk
 Kenneth R. H. Mackenzie (1833–1886), translated the German tale Till Eulenspiegel into English as Master Tyll Owlglass: His Marvellous Adventures and Rare Conceits (1860)
 Kenneth Ross MacKenzie (1912–2002), American physicist and discoverer of astatine

See also
 Ken McKenzie (disambiguation)
 Kennith McKenzie or Ken McKenzie (1865–1917), Australian rules footballer for Port Adelaide